Fringe is an American science fiction television series that originally aired on the Fox network from September 9, 2008, to January 18, 2013. The series follows the Fringe Team as it investigates bizarre scientific occurrences related to "The Pattern", a string of freak, fringe science–related incidents worldwide. The team consists of FBI special agent Olivia Dunham (Anna Torv), eccentric scientist Walter Bishop (John Noble) and his genius son Peter Bishop (Joshua Jackson), as well as others at the FBI and the Department of Homeland Security. The series' narrative evolves and it later centers on a parallel universe and then on the mysterious Observers – a group of expressionless, pale, bald men in suits who have appeared throughout documented human history at significant historical events.

Fringe was created by J. J. Abrams, Alex Kurtzman, and Roberto Orci. They took inspiration from multiple sources including the works of Michael Crichton and David Cronenberg, the film Altered States, and the television series The X-Files and The Twilight Zone. The three also sought to combine elements of procedural shows like Law & Order with an "extremely serialized and very culty" series like Lost, which Abrams co-created. Fringes pilot episode was picked up by Fox in May 2008, and premiered on September 9.  Critics hailed the series as a successor to Lost, as the two shared many similarities including Abrams' involvement, characters exploring a series of unexplained events, the use of many of the same actors and writers, and the difficulty in categorizing each show within just one genre. Explored themes in Fringe include free will, the potential benefits and risks of emerging technologies, the nature of time, and the differences that separate faith and reason.

The series was broadcast across five seasons and 100 episodes. Its first season included 20 episodes, while its second contained 23 installments, though one of these, "Unearthed", was filmed during the first season. The third and fourth seasons contained 22 episodes, while the fifth featured thirteen installments. Fringes ratings started strongly with a weekly episode average of 8.8 million, achieving first place in the 18–49 adult demographic among the 2008–09 television season's new shows. In addition to these solid ratings, the first season garnered a generally favorable critical reception. Later seasons gradually suffered a decrease in ratings—the series finale being watched by just 3.2 million viewers—though the series did develop a cult following. Entertainment Weekly conjectures that despite its ratings decline, Fringe survived for five seasons in part because of Fox executive Kevin Reilly's love of the series, and also due to the network's desire to make amends for the science fiction shows it had previously canceled. 

Across its run the series earned many accolades, though it failed to win major awards. At the Television Critics Awards, Fringe earned a 2009 award that designated it "Outstanding New Program of the Year". Fringe won seven Saturn Awards among fifteen nominations; from 2009–11, Torv won for Best Actress on Television, while Noble won for Best Supporting Actor on Television in 2010. Noble won a similar award at the 2011 Critics' Choice Television Awards, where the series and Torv also received nominations. Additionally, the series received nominations for two Primetime Creative Arts Emmy Awards, eight Golden Reel Awards, two Satellite Awards, and two Writers Guild of America Awards.  Its series finale, "An Enemy of Fate", was considered by Wired magazine to mark the end of science fiction on American network television.

Series overview

Episodes
Season 1 (2008–09)

Season 2 (2009–10)

Season 3 (2010–11)

Season 4 (2011–12)

Season 5 (2012–13)

Ratings

See also

ReferencesWorks cited'

External links
 
 

 
Fringe
Fringe

it:Fringe#Episodi